The Manus fantail (Rhipidura semirubra) is a bird species endemic to the Admiralty Islands of Papua New Guinea.

References

External links
BirdLife Species Factsheet

Manus fantail
Birds of the Admiralty Islands
Manus fantail
Manus fantail